Alamat (Baybayin: ᜀᜎᜋᜆ᜔) is a Filipino boy group formed in 2020 by Viva Artist Agency and Ninuno Media. The group consists of six members: Taneo, Mo, Jao, Tomas, R-Ji and Alas. Originally a nine-piece ensemble, Kin departed the group in late March 2021 due to personal reasons, followed by Valfer and Gami, who also left in late March 2022. Formed through PWEDE: The National Boyband Search, the group distinguishes itself as a multilingual and multiethnic boy band that sings in seven Philippine languages: Tagalog, Ilocano, Kapampangan, Cebuano, Hiligaynon, Bikolano, and Waray-Waray. After training for nine months, the group debuted on February 14, 2021 with their first single, "kbye." Alamat currently holds the distinction of being the second P-pop group to make it on Billboard chart and the fastest-rising Pinoy act on the Billboard Next Big Sound chart, debuting at #2.

Members 
The boy band consists of six members aged 20 to 24 years old. They came from different provinces in the Philippines and were put together through an online audition held by their company.

Discography

Extended plays

Singles

Television shows

Concerts

Awards and recognitions

References 

Filipino boy bands
Filipino pop music groups
Musical groups established in 2020
Musical groups from Metro Manila
2020 establishments in the Philippines